Carl Boggs (born 22 July 1937) is a social science and film studies professor at the National University in Los Angeles.

He received a  Ph. D. in Political Science from the University of California, Berkeley in 1970. He has also taught at the  University of South Carolina and Washington University.

He has written numerous books on subjects including social theory, European and American politics, and military policy. He has contributed  to several socialist organizations and journals, such as Solidarity (United States), the LA Socialist Community School, and the Free Speech Movement.

He received a Charles A. McCoy Career Achievement Award.

Publications

Books
 Boggs, Carl. Fugitive Politics: The Struggle for Ecological Sanity. 'New York, NY : Routledge, 2022. 
 Boggs, Carl. Impasse Of European Communism.  Routledge, 2021. 
Review by Richard J. Willey American Political Science Review , Volume 77 , Issue 3 , September 1983 , pp. 769 - 770 
 Boggs, Carl. Fascism Old and New American Politics at the Crossroads. Boca Raton, FL: Routledge, an imprint of Taylor and Francis, 2018. 
 Boggs, Carl. The Hollywood War Machine: U.S. Militarism and Popular Culture. Routledge , 2017.   (Cited 198 times, according to Google Scholar  
 Boggs, Carl. Origins of the Warfare State: World War II and the Transformation of American Politics.Routledge 2017.   
 Boggs, Carl. Drugs, Power, and Politics: Narco Wars, Big Pharma, and the Subversion of Democracy. 2016. 
 Boggs, Carl. Empire Versus Democracy: The Triumph of Corporate and Military Power. Routledge 2016. 
 Boggs, Carl. Ecology and Revolution: Global Crisis and the Political Challenge. Basingstoke: Palgrave Macmillan, 2012.
 Boggs, Carl. Phantom Democracy: Corporate Interests and Political Power in America. New York: Palgrave Macmillan, 2011. 
 Boggs, Carl. The Crimes of Empire: Rogue Superpower and World Domination. London: Pluto, 2010.  According to WorldCat, the book is held in 1208 libraries
 Boggs, James. The American Revolution: Pages from a Negro Worker's Notebook. New York, NY: Monthly Review Press, 2009. Originally published in The Monthly Review, 1962 
 Boggs, Carl. Imperial Delusions: American Militarism and Endless War. Lanham, Md: Rowman & Littlefield, 2005. 
 Boggs, Carl, and Thomas Pollard. A World in Chaos: Social Crisis and the Rise of Postmodern Cinema. Lanham, Md: Rowman & Littlefield Publishers, 2003. 
 Boggs, Carl. The End of Politics: Corporate Power and the Decline of the Public Sphere. New York: Guilford Press, 2001.  (Cited 536 times, according to Google Scholar  ) 
Review, Tim Duvall (2001)  Democracy & Nature, 7:1, 205-208, 
 Boggs, Carl. The Socialist Tradition : from Crisis to Decline. New York: Routledge, 1995. 
 Boggs, Carl. Intellectuals and the Crisis of Modernity. Albany: State University of New York Press, 1993. (Cited 213 times, according to Google Scholar  
Review, by Steve Vieux Critical Sociology  Vol 21, Issue 1, 1995.
Translated into Chinese by  Jun Li and Hairong Cai  知识分子与现代性的危机 / Zhi shi fen zi yu xian dai xing de wei ji Nanjing, 2002 
 Boggs, Carl. Social Movements and Political Power: Emerging Forms of Radicalism in the West. Philadelphia, Pa: Temple University Press, 1986.  (Cited 482 times, according to Google Scholar  
Review, by H Kitschelt - American Political Science Review, Volume 83 , Issue 1 , March 1989 , pp. 316 - 317  
 Boggs, Carl. The Two Revolutions: Antonio Gramsci and the Dilemmas of Western Marxism. Boston, MA: South End Press, 1984.
Translated into Korean by Mun-gu Kang as  다시그람시에게로 / Tasi Gŭramsi egero
 Boggs, Carl, and David Plotke. The Politics of Eurocommunism: Eclipse of the Bolshevik Legacy in the West. Montreal: Black Rose Books, 1980.

Journal articles
 Boggs, Carl. "Marxism, prefigurative communism, and the problem of workers’ control." Radical America 11.6 (1977): 99-122. (Cited 394 times, according to Google Scholar  ) 
 Boggs C. Social Capital and Political Fantasy: Robert Putnam's" Bowling Alone". Theory and Society. 2001 Apr 1;30(2):281-97. (Cited 171 times, according to Google Scholar.)
 Boggs C. The great retreat: Decline of the public sphere in late twentieth-century America. Theory and Society. 1997 Dec 1;26(6):741-80. (Cited 135 times, according to Google Scholar.)  
 Boggs C, Pollard T. Hollywood and the Spectacle of Terrorism. New Political Science. 2006 Sep 1;28(3):335-51.(Cited 127 times, according to Google Scholar.) 
 Boggs C. Revolutionary process, political strategy, and the dilemma of power. Theory and Society. 1977 Sep 1;4(3):359-93. (Cited 85 times, according to Google Scholar.)

References

External links
 

1937 births
Living people
American political scientists
Ventura College alumni
American military historians
University of South Carolina faculty
American film historians
20th-century American male writers
20th-century American historians
21st-century American male writers
21st-century American historians
Washington University in St. Louis faculty
University of California, Berkeley alumni